Roots Ivy International University College is a for-profit university college affiliated with University of London International Programmes and the BPP University in UK.

It is located in Rawalpindi/Islamabad area of Pakistan. It has several branches all over Pakistan.

Khadija Mushtaq is its founder and dean.

It is associated with the for-profit Roots School System in Pakistan. The main objective of the university is to provide high quality, internationally recognized undergraduate education to its students.

It also provides degrees in affiliation with Association of Chartered Certified Accountants, Higher National Diploma and Institute of Commercial Management.

It also has satellite campuses in Faisalabad and Islamabad.

Khadija Mushtaq has earned a reputation as a passionate, dedicated, and visionary educational leader in Pakistan who has pioneered the concept of career counselling and mentoring her students. Her students are sought after by the leading international universities in the United States, United Kingdom. Each year many of her students, after graduating from Roots Ivy, get 100% scholarships from these well-known international universities to go abroad for further studies.

Academics

Distant and flexible learning
A broad range of undergraduate degrees by University of London are offered:
 Economics
 Business Management
 Finance
 Social Sciences
  Offers B.A. LLB and M.A. LLM Law degrees provided by the BPP University International Programme
 Roots Ivy International University students are also encouraged to learn German language and then go to Germany for further studies there.

References

External links
Roots Ivy International University on Facebook

;

University of London Worldwide
Distance education institutions based in Pakistan
Universities and colleges in Islamabad
Private universities and colleges in Pakistan